Thomas Halbert (8 July 1806 – 12 April 1865) was a New Zealand whaler, trader and founding father. He was born in Newcastle upon Tyne, Northumberland, England and baptised on 25 December 1814 in Gateshead, Durham, England.

Early life
Thomas was the son of William Halbert (1766-1815) and Sarah 1771-1814. William and Sarah Halbert had at least 11 children:

 Sarah Halbert died 1795
 William Halbert born 1792
 Alice Halbert born 1794
 John Halbert 1796-1854
 Sarah Halbert born 1798
 Elizabeth Halbert born 1799
 George Potts Halbert 1802-1851
 Joseph Halbert 1803-1838
 Elizabeth Halbert 1804-1807
 Mary Ann Halbert 1805-1806
 Thomas Halbert 1806-1865

Little is known about Thomas before his emigration to New Zealand. Upon emigrating to New Zealand he would marry six times. His wives included:

Wives & children
Unknown first wife from Rongomaiwahine in Māhia Peninsula
Pirihira Konekone from Manutuke.
Mereana Wero of Te Aitanga-a-Mahaki descent
Riria Mauaranui of Te Aitanga-a-Mahaki descent. They were married on 21 April 1839 by Bishop William Williams.
Kaikiri (who would later Anglicize her name to Keita) of Ngati Kaipoho and Rongowhakaata descent from Manutuke, 
Maora Pani of Rongowhakaata and Rakaipaaka descent.

His children were:

With his first wife
unknown son who died at infancy.

With Pirihira Konekone, his second wife
Otene Pitau

With Mereana Wero, his third wife 
 No Issue

With Riria Mauaranui, his fourth wife
Wi Pere (born William Pere Halbert)

With Kaikiri, his fifth wife
Kate Gannon (nee Halbert, formerly Wyllie. She married twice and died as Kate Gannon, however she is more famously known as Kate Wyllie)
Hera (Sarah) Halbert married William Alexander Wyllie. After his death she married James Cunningham. After his death she married Paratene Tatae.
Mere (Mary) Halbert married Alexander Heany. She divorced him then married Donald Gordon.
Maata (Martha) Rewanga Halbert married Arthur Francis Cuff.

With Maora Pani, his sixth wife
Alice Matewai Halbert married Karepa Mataira.
Twins who died at infancy
Thomas Halbert Jr married Ripeka Matahaere Brown.

Notable descendants
Some of descendants include:

All Blacks rugby player, William "Bill" Cunningham (his grandson through his daughter, Sarah)
Historian, Rongowhakaata Halbert (his great-grandson through his son, Wi Pere)
Reremoana Hakiwai (nee Halbert) (his great-granddaughter through his daughter, Sarah)
Author, Witi Ihimaera (his great-great-grandson through his son, Wi Pere)
Museum of New Zealand Te Papa Tongarewa curator, Arapata Hakiwai (his great-great grandson through his daughter, Sarah)
Politician and former rugby player, Tu Wyllie (his great-great grandson through his daughter, Kate)
Politician, Meka Whaitiri (his fourth-great granddaughter through his daughter Sarah).

Death
Halbert died 12 April 1865 when he was crossing the Taruheru River and became stuck in the mud. He drowned as the tide came back in and was buried at Makaraka Cemetery. A street in Makaraka is named for him.

References

1808 births
1865 deaths
New Zealand traders
New Zealand people in whaling
Businesspeople from Newcastle upon Tyne
English emigrants to New Zealand
Settlers of New Zealand
Halbert-Kohere family